NGC 4066 is an elliptical galaxy located 340 million light-years away in the constellation Coma Berenices. The galaxy was discovered by astronomer William Herschel on April 27, 1785. NGC 4066 is a member of the NGC 4065 Group.

See also
 List of NGC objects (4001–5000)

References

External links

4066
038161
07051
Coma Berenices
Astronomical objects discovered in 1785
Elliptical galaxies
NGC 4065 Group
Discoveries by William Herschel